This is a survey of the postage stamps and postal history of Lithuania.

Early postal history 
The postal history of Lithuania started around the 10th or 12th century or even earlier, with a pre-Christian messaging system known as krivūlė. The first mail service was introduced in 1562, connecting Vilnius with Kraków, and Venice.

German occupation, 1916-1919 
Lithuania was under the rule of the Russian Empire until the 20th century. After the outbreak of  World War I, Germany occupied Lithuania and Courland in 1915. The civil administration of the Oberbefehlhaber Ost was created in the German-occupied territory of the Russian Empire. Stamps of Germany overprinted "Postgebiet Ob. Ost" were issued in 1916.

First stamps of the Republic 

The Act of Independence of Lithuania was adopted on 16 February 1918, proclaiming Lithuania as an independent republic. The first Lithuanian postage stamps ("Baltukai" issue) were issued in Vilnius in 1918. A total of 768 stamps of different designs were issued by the Republic of Lithuania between 1918 and 1940, with more than 2,000 variations due to errors, misprints or perforations. The first airmail stamps were issued in 1921.

Soviet occupation, 1940-1941 
After the 1940 occupation by the Soviet Union, Lithuanian postage stamps were overprinted "LTSR" (Lietuvos Tarybų Socialistinė Respublika, Lithuanian for Lithuanian Socialist Soviet Republic). These were then replaced by Soviet stamps.

German occupation, 1941-1945 
On June 22, 1941, Nazi Germany invaded the Soviet Union. Following the German occupation, Soviet stamps were overprinted "Nepriklausoma Lietuva 1941-VI-23" (Independent Lithuania 1941-VI-23) in 1941. Lithuania became part of the Reichskommissariat Ostland, the German occupation administration. Stamps were issued for use in the Reichskommissariat Ostland by overprinting "Ostland" on stamps of Germany.

Soviet era 
After the war, the Soviet Union reestablished occupation over Lithuania and Soviet stamps came into use again.

Restoration of independence 
After Lithuania declared the restoration of independence on 11 March 1990, Lithuania again issued own stamps. Lithuania's independence was recognized by the Soviet Union on September 6, 1991.

Local issues 
There were also several local issues, including the Raseiniai local issue (1919), Telšiai Postmaster's provisional issue (1920), Grodno issue (1919), and others.

Central Lithuania 
In the course of the Polish–Soviet War, pro-Polish separatists proclaimed the creation of the Republic of Central Lithuania (Litwa Środkowa) centered around Vilnius in October 1920. Central Lithuania issued stamps from 1920 until annexation by Poland in 1922.

Memel 
In 1920, according to the Treaty of Versailles, the German area north of the Memel river was given the status of Territoire de Memel under the administration of the Council of Ambassadors, and French troops were sent for protection.

On 9 January 1923, Lithuania occupied the territory during the Klaipėda Revolt and the territory was annexed by Lithuania.

See also 
 Lithuania Philatelic Society

References

Sources
 Postage Stamp of Lithuania (1979, New York) 
 Lietuvos pasto zenklai: Pasto zenklu katalogas

External links
 History of Lithuanian Post Office
 Lithuanian postage stamps 1918-1940
 Lithuanian postage stamps from 1990 on Lithuania Post official page
 Postal history of Lithuania
 Local stamp issues of Lithuania

Postal system of Lithuania
Philately of Lithuania